Michael Martin is a fictional character from the Australian soap opera Neighbours, played by Troy Beckwith. He made his first screen appearance during the episode broadcast on 8 October 1985. The character was originally played by Samuel Hammington. Beckwith took over the role in 1992. Michael departed on 26 June 1998.

Development
Shortly after his return to Erinsborough, Michael began dating Cody Willis (Peta Brady). Beckwith told an Inside Soap columnist, "Michael falls for Cody in a big way. But unbeknown to him, she really likes Rick Alessi (Dan Falzon)." Although Cody liked Michael, she did not want "a heavy" relationship and resisted his attempts to take things further. Beckwith explained that Michael was hurt when she refused to have sex with him, but he was unaware that she had been in a "disastrous" relationship before, so he thought he had done something to put her off. The Inside Soap columnist did not blame Cody for being worried about whether Michael would treat her right due to his "murky" past. Beckwith pointed out that the time Michael spent in the detention centre helped straighten him out and he had become "a bit of a goody-goody". Beckwith preferred it when his character was bad, as he felt Michael was more fun to play.

Storylines
Michael is first seen, along with his sister, Debbie when Julie Robinson arrives at their father Philip's neighbour's house to break the news of a car accident that leaves Philip paralysed and their mother, Loretta dead. Julie helps look after the children and eventually marries Philip and they all move to the country and are heard from sparingly throughout the years.

Michael returns from boarding school several months after the family re-settle in Ramsay Street. He quickly creates mischief and begins targeting Julie and plays mind games with her out of resentment, blaming her for Loretta's death. Michael also resents his half-sister Hannah (Rebecca Ritters) and is unkind toward her. When Hannah and Beth Brennan (Natalie Imbruglia) are caught in a fire in an abandoned house behind Lassiter's, Michael is a suspected but is later cleared when it is revealed he had been in the arcade at the time of the fire.

Michael later descends into crime and is eventually arrested. While in the detention centre, he meets Darren Stark (Scott Major) and both boys immediately hate each other. When Rick Alessi, Debbie's ex-boyfriend tells Michael about Darren dating and using Debbie, Michael is keen to break out and escapes the Detention centre, dressed as a woman. When Michael and Rick arrive at the service station, they find Darren armed with a knife and Debbie in tow. Michael bursts in to save his sister, only to be shot by the cashier, who assumes Michael was in on the attempted robbery. Michael survives and Darren is arrested.

At Christmas 1993, Michael returns home for good, having changed his ways but Julie and Hannah are not keen on him being around. He decides to move into a youth hostel but is talked out of it at the last minute and Julie, Hannah and Michael agree to put the past behind them. As 1994 begins, Michael befriends the recently returned Cody Willis, who he begins dating and Darren's siblings, Brett (Brett Blewitt) and Danni (Eliza Szonert).

After Michael's relationship with Cody ends when he finds out that she is attracted to Rick, he begins dating Danni. When Danni and Michael are caught with needles by Pam Willis (Sue Jones) and Julie, the worst is assumed but everything is resolved when it is revealed Danni is diabetic. Helen Daniels (Anne Haddy), Julie's grandmother begins seeing former resident Len Mangel (John Lee), Michael does a little investigating and figures out that Len is out to rip Helen off. When Michael and Danni's relationship becomes physical, it puts a strain on their parents and it is decided that one half of the couple will have to leave. Michael takes a place at the Brosnan Centre in Marree.

After learning of Julie's accident after falling from the tower during a Murder Mystery weekend, Michael returns to Erinsborough. When Julie dies in hospital and Philip is accused of pushing her, Michael stands by his father. Michael returns home the following year for Christmas and catches up with old friends. During this visit, Michael manages to put Malcolm Kennedy's (Benjamin McNair) nose out of joint, causing him to become paranoid that Michael has returned to win Danni back and also takes a dislike to Jen Handley (Alyce Platt), Philip's new girlfriend. When Helen dies in 1997, Michael drives through the night to make it home to support the family and attends the memorial service at Lassiter's lake. Before leaving, he suggests Debbie comes back to Maree with him, which upsets Hannah at first but something she later accepts.

Michael makes his final return to Ramsay Street in 1998, for Philip's wedding to Ruth Wilkinson (Ailsa Piper) and tries to cheer up Hannah, who is having trouble adjusting to the new blended family, which includes Ruth's children, Ben Atkins (Brett Cousins), Lance (Andrew Bibby) and Anne (Brooke Satchwell). Michael suggests keeping photos of Ruth up to make her feel welcome, while Hannah keeps photos of Julie in her room, just for the wedding day.

Reception
Writing for The Guardian, Richard Arnold branded the character "sicko Micko" and said he "wreaks havoc" when he "turns up to bring an Amityville touch to the Robinson household".

Ausculture placed Michael at number ten on their Top Ten Aussie Soap Villains list. They said "Michael Martin was a troubled teen. He bullied his half-sister Hannah (fair enough, I reckon), tried to kill his stepmother Julie Martin (hang on, that sounds fair enough too!), forced Toby Mangel to help him win money on the horses, and nearly knocked up Danni Stark! In the scheme of Neighbours teenagers, this makes him the Charles Manson of Ramsay Street."

Heckler Spray included Michael in their list of "The Best Ever Mid-90s Neighbours Characters". Of Michael they said "Michael Martin was nothing short of pure evil, playing the angelic son on his return from boarding school, while simultaneously turning hated stepmum (and weird guilty pleasure) Julie into an alcoholic, and convincing everyone she had gone mad. Michael was one of Neighbours''' few convincing bad guys, who probably arbitrarily converted to being good at a later date." Adam Beresford from HuffPost'' branded Michael the show's "demon child".

References

External links
 Michael Martin at the BBC
 Michael Martin at Neighbours.com

Neighbours characters
Fictional criminals in soap operas
Television characters introduced in 1985
Male characters in television
Male villains